Pascal Mesenburg, pen name Mezzo, is a French cartoonist born in Drancy, France in 1960.

Biography 
Very early, he is appealed by the 1960-1970 rock sleeves and the American underground scene (Robert Crumb, Rick Griffin, Robert Williams, etc.) that bring an "electric" counterpoint to his Franco-Belgian (Hergé, Ever Meulen) and older American influences (George Herriman, Chester Gould, Will Eisner).

In 1978, he is admitted to the École nationale supérieure des Beaux-Arts and École nationale supérieure des arts appliqués et des métiers d'art of Paris, where he passes through, preferring to devote himself to music. At the same time, he publishes his illustrations in various fanzines (Le Crapaud baveux, Flag, Ogoun !...),  (Sortez la chienne...) and Parisian magazines (Rock en Stock, Best, Zoulou (Actuel), L'Écho des savanes, Playboy, Métal Aventure...) and participates in some advertising campaigns (Pall Mall, greeting card for Dupuy Saatchi, Renault...).

In 1988, he meets , with whom he devoted himself mainly to comics without abandoning graphic design and illustration. With his realistic, dark and precise stroke, between ligne claire and density of black, he is easily associated with the contemporary American line.

King of the Flies (Le Roi des mouches - 2005 for vol. 1) was noticed by critics. It has been translated in Spain (La Cúpula), the Netherlands (Sherpa) and the United States (Fantagraphics Books). On this series he works with Michel Pirus in the script and the colorist Ruby.

In 2014 is published Love in Vain, which recounts the life of bluesman Robert Johnson, with Jean-Michel Dupont in the script.

Bibliography 

 With Michel Pirus, scenarist

 1991 : Les Désarmés T.1, éd. Zenda 
 1993 : Les Désarmés T.2, éd. Zenda 
 1995 : Deux tueurs, éd. Delcourt 
 1996 : Un monde étrange (6 short stories published initially by Humanoïdes Associés in collection « Frank Margerin présente »), éd. Delcourt 
 1997 : Mickey Mickey, éd. Delcourt 
 2005 : Le Roi des mouches, T.1, Hallorave, éd. Albin Michel - (Official selection of Angoulême International Comics Festival 2006) 
 2008 : Le Roi des mouches, T.2, L’Origine du monde, éd. Drugstore (Glénat) - (Official selection of  Angoulême International Comics Festival 2009) 
 2010 : Les Désarmés (full version reworked and recolored), éd. Drugstore (Glénat) 
 2013 : Le Roi des mouches T.3, Sourire suivant, éd. Glénat - (Official selection of Angoulême International Comics Festival 2014) 

 With Jean-Michel Dupont, scenarist

 2014 : Love in Vain, Hors collection, éd. Glénat  — prix des Libraires de Bande Dessinée 2015

Awards 
2008 : Prix de la BD du Point, with Michel Pirus, for King of the Flies, vol 2 : The Origin of the World.

Notes and references 

1960 births
French comics artists
Pseudonymous writers
Living people